McCleary is a city in Grays Harbor County, Washington, United States.  The population was 1,997 at the 2020 census.

History
Henry McCleary came to the land in 1897, building two sawmills and a door manufacturing company. He sold the land and the companies to Simpson Logging Company, December 31, 1941. On January 9, 1943 the land became an incorporated city named after its founder.  The , designed by Joseph Wohleb, stills stands in Olympia, Washington and is listed on the National Register of Historic Places.

In 1959, McCleary started its Bear Festival. It was an idea that bears that were in surplus came and ate the bark from the evergreen trees and killing the trees after hibernation. People from all over have come to taste its bear stew. Although the bear stew is the big attraction to the festival, there is also a kiddies parade, grand parade, royal court ceremony, bands, dances, slow-pitch baseball, and many other events in all three days.

Geography
McCleary is located at  (47.055359, -123.268859).

Demographics

2010 census
As of the census of 2010, there were 1,653 people, 699 households, and 427 families living in the city. The racial makeup of the city was 93.5% White, 0.8% African American, 1.0% Native American, 0.7% Asian, 0.1% Pacific Islander, 0.4% from other races, and 3.4% from two or more races. Hispanic or Latino of any race were 2.4% of the population.

There were 699 households, of which 29.6% had children under the age of 18 living with them, 43.5% were married couples living together, 13.2% had a female householder with no husband present, 4.4% had a male householder with no wife present, and 38.9% were non-families. 31.9% of all households were made up of individuals, and 19.1% had someone living alone who was 65 years of age or older. The average household size was 2.36 and the average family size was 2.95.

The median age in the city was 37.4 years. 24.6% of residents were under the age of 18; 7.7% were between the ages of 18 and 24; 28.8% were from 25 to 44; 21.7% were from 45 to 64; and 17.1% were 65 years of age or older. The gender makeup of the city was 47.7% male and 52.3% female.

2000 census
As of the census of 2000, there were 1,454 people, 555 households, and 376 families living in the city. The population density was 800.2 people per square mile (308.5/km2). There were 583 housing units at an average density of 320.9 per square mile (123.7/km2). The racial makeup of the city was 94.36% White, 0.21% African American, 0.89% Native American, 0.28% Asian, 0.76% from other races, and 3.51% from two or more races. Hispanic or Latino of any race were 2.20% of the population.

There were 555 households, out of which 32.1% had children under the age of 18 living with them, 50.3% were married couples living together, 13.7% had a female householder with no husband present, and 32.1% were non-families. 27.2% of all households were made up of individuals, and 13.2% had someone living alone who was 65 years of age or older. The average household size was 2.48 and the average family size was 3.00.

In the city, the population was spread out, with 25.0% under the age of 18, 7.7% from 18 to 24, 27.0% from 25 to 44, 21.5% from 45 to 64, and 18.8% who were 65 years of age or older. The median age was 38 years. For every 100 females, there were 91.1 males. For every 100 females age 18 and over, there were 87.0 males.

The median income for a household in the city was $30,769, and the median income for a family was $36,534. Males had a median income of $33,421 versus $25,417 for females. The per capita income for the city was $14,249. About 12.2% of families and 17.8% of the population were below the poverty line, including 22.9% of those under age 18 and 24.5% of those age 65 or over.

School District

In 1901, there was a one-room class serving 60 students. In 1909, the district was official and a school was built on the current location. McCleary has since then had four remodels. It currently serves 50 preschoolers and 270 K-8th graders. In 1988, McCleary school district began a scholarship program for its students. When a student who completed their 8th grade class in McCleary Elementary School graduates high school, they are awarded a scholarship equal to the sum of $55 per year that they attended McCleary, including kindergarten. This scholarship may be used for college or any type of skilled training or trade school. Most high school students travel to Elma or Capital High School.

Twinned Cities
Rossington, England, UK.

Notable people
 Angelo Pellegrini, author
 Clarence Chesterfield Howerton, circus performer

City government
The City of McCleary is governed by a mayor, as well as five councilmembers representing 5 different districts. The McCleary City Council currently meets on the 2nd and 4th Wednesdays of each month at the McCleary City Hall, beginning at 6:30 pm.

Mayor: Brenda Orffer
Councilmember, pos 1 & Mayor Pro Tem: Dustin Richey
Councilmember, pos 2: Brycen Huff
Councilmember, pos 3: Jaron Heller
Councilmember, pos 4: Ben Blankenship
Councilmember, pos 5: Joy Iversen

References

Cities in Washington (state)
Cities in Grays Harbor County, Washington